Low-carbon technology can refer to:

 Low-carbon building
 Low Carbon Building Programme
 Low Carbon Communities
 Low-carbon economy
 Low-carbon fuel standard
 Low-carbon power

See also

 2000-watt society
 Carbon neutrality